Xiaolingwei is a city located in Jiangsu, China, near Nanjing. It is south of Nanjing's Zhongshan Gate and southeast of the Ming Dynasty imperial tombs of Nanjing. The city has a population of 66,031, making it the 35th largest city in Jiangsu. It operates on China Standard Time, the same as the rest of China.

References

Geography of Jiangsu